Luzianes-Gare is a Portuguese parish in the municipality of Odemira. The population in 2011 was 429, in an area of 94.36 km2.

References

Freguesias of Odemira